Max Watson (born 3 February 1996) is a Swedish football defender who plays for Slovenian PrvaLiga side Maribor.

Club career
On 11 January 2022, Watson signed a contract with Slovenian PrvaLiga side Maribor until 2024, on a free transfer.

International career
In 2013, Watson made three appearances for the Swedish under-19 team.

Personal life
Watson played handball in his youth, but later opted for football. He is of English descent, as his father moved from England to Sweden at the age of 18.

References

External links
Max Watson at Swedish Football Association 

1996 births
Living people
Swedish footballers
Swedish expatriate footballers
Association football defenders
Jönköpings Södra IF players
Norrby IF players
Mjällby AIF players
NK Maribor players
Superettan players
Ettan Fotboll players
Allsvenskan players
Slovenian PrvaLiga players
Sweden youth international footballers
Swedish expatriate sportspeople in Slovenia
Expatriate footballers in Slovenia
Swedish people of English descent